Samuel Peter Matterface (born 21 April 1978) is an English sports broadcaster currently working for TalkSPORT and ITV Sport.

Career
Matterface started working in sports radio in 1992 for local hospital radio station OHR, before moving into commercial radio at 16. He worked at BBC Radio Kent in 1998, then Capital Radio Sport from 1999. Matterface worked at the south-coast radio station 107.4 The Quay, where he presented the breakfast show and a variety of sports related programmes from 2001–2007.

Between 2006 and 2007, Matterface worked on the Sky channel Bravo, featuring in weekly segments on the football magazine show Football Italia. He presented short reels, entitled "What's a Matter You?", showcasing the more light-hearted moments of the Serie A gameweek, amidst the ongoing 2006 match-fixing scandal. The section was dropped in 2007 when the rights to Italian football were acquired by the free-to-air broadcaster Channel 5.

He started presenting on Sky Sports News in July 2007, before leaving in late 2010.

On 12 January 2018, Matterface was confirmed as Matt Chapman's replacement as commentator for ITV's Dancing on Ice.

On 14 July 2020, ITV announced that Matterface would replace Clive Tyldesley as lead football and England commentator at the start of the 2020-2021 season.

Personal life
Matterface is a supporter of Chelsea. He was previously married to former Sky Sports colleague Natalie Sawyer with whom he has a child.

References

External links
 

1978 births
English association football commentators
English sports broadcasters
Living people
People from Dartford
Television personalities from Kent